Huddersfield Town's 1961–62 campaign was a thoroughly impressive season for the Town, following the previous season's near miss with relegation to Division 3. In Eddie Boot's first full season in charge, Town finished in 7th place in Division 2 with 44 points, 10 off 2nd placed Leyton Orient and a further 8 behind league champions Liverpool.

Squad at the start of the season

Review
After just missing out on relegation to Division 3, Eddie Boot took his first full season in charge to try to raise Town up to the top half of the Division 2. Town made a promising start with 4 wins from their first 6 games, including a 5–1 win against Plymouth Argyle and a 4–3 win at Luton Town. Derek Stokes had a great start to the season with 8 goals from the first 9 league games including a hat-trick in the 4–2 win against Walsall. An indifferent spell in October and November saw Town lose ground, but a player exchange in February would see Town surge up the table.

Jim Kerray moved to Newcastle United with experienced striker Len White returning to his native Yorkshire. His 8 goals in 16 matches propelled Town to the upper reaches of the Division 2. They would finish the season in 7th place with 44 points.

Squad at the end of the season

Results

Division Two

FA Cup

Football League Cup

Appearances and goals

1961-62
English football clubs 1961–62 season